Wagoner is an unincorporated community in Mineral County, West Virginia, United States. Wagoner lies along the North Branch Potomac River at Round Bottom Hollow between the communities of Dans Run and Green Spring. Wagoner is located at the northern terminus of West Virginia Secondary Route 15/2.

References 

Unincorporated communities in Mineral County, West Virginia
Unincorporated communities in West Virginia
Populated places on the North Branch Potomac River